Navia stenodonta is a plant species in the genus Navia. This species is endemic to Venezuela.

References

stenodonta
Flora of Venezuela